There are at least 44 named mountains in Teton County, Montana.
 Antelope Butte, el. 
 Arsenic Mountain, el. 
 Bennie Hill, el. 
 Bloody Hill, el. 
 Bosseler Ridge, el. 
 Bum Shot Mountain, el. 
 Castle Reef, el. 
 Cave Mountain, el. 
 Choteau Mountain, el. 
 Chute Mountain, el. 
 Clay Hill, el. 
 Crab Butte, el. 
 Crooked Mountain, el. 
 Ear Mountain, el. 
 Elk Hill, el. 
 Floweree Butte, el. 
 Grass Hill, el. 
 Horse Hill, el. 
 Hurricane Mountain (Montana), el. 
 Indian Head Rock (Montana), el. 
 Moehler Hill, el. 
 Mount Drouillard, el. 
 Mount Field, el. 
 Mount Frazier, el. 
 Mount Lockhart, el. 
 Mount Patrick Gass, el. 
 Mount Sentinel, el. 
 Mount Werner, el. 
 Mount Wright, el. 
 Mule Hill, el. 
 Nunemaker Hill, el. 
 Old Baldy, el. 
 Old Man of the Hills, el. 
 Pine Butte, el. 
 Poker Butte, el. 
 Priest Butte, el. 
 Rattlesnake Butte, el. 
 Rocky Mountain, el. 
 Sevenmile Hill, el. 
 Spring Hill, el. 
 Sulphur Hill, el. 
 Teton Buttes, el. 
 Teton Peak, el. 
 Wind Mountain, el.

See also
 List of mountains in Montana
 List of mountain ranges in Montana

Notes

Landforms of Teton County, Montana
Teton